Jaws are an English indie rock band formed in Birmingham, England in 2012 after singer Connor Schofield had posted a demo (Cameron) online that received enough positive feedback to encourage him to start a band with friends from Halesowen College. The band's discography includes three studio albums, two extended plays, and 16 singles.

The band released their first studio album Be Slowly in 2014 through SideOneDummy Records, following the release of their two extended plays: Milkshake and Gold, which were both released in 2013. Since their first studio album, Jaws have released two self-released studio albums: Simplicity in 2016 and The Ceiling in 2019.

Studio albums

Extended plays

Singles

References 
Main
 
Citations

Discographies of British artists
Rock music group discographies